is a railway station in the city of Yurihonjō, Akita Prefecture,  Japan, operated by the third-sector  railway operator Yuri Kōgen Railway.

Lines
Kubota Station is served by the Chōkai Sanroku Line, and is located 13.6 kilometers from the terminus of the line at Ugo-Honjō Station.

Station layout
The station has one side platform, serving one bi-directional track. The station is unattended.

Adjacent stations

History
Kubota Station opened on October 1, 1985.

Surrounding area
 Koyoshi River

See also
List of railway stations in Japan

External links

Railway stations in Akita Prefecture
Railway stations in Japan opened in 1985
Yurihonjō